Danti is an Italian surname. Notable people with this surname include:

 Davide Danti (1938–2011), Italian illustrator/artist/translator
 Domenico Danti (born 1989), Italian footballer
 Girolamo Danti (1547–1580), Italian painter
 Ignazio Danti, Italian priest, mathematician, astronomer, and cosmographer
 Ignazio Danti (bishop) (1536–1586), Italian bishop
 Nicola Danti (born 1966), Italian politician
 Teodora Danti (c.1498–c.1573), Italian painter
 Vincenzo Danti (1530–1576), Italian sculptor